is a J-pop Japanese singer and songwriter who was active in the 1990s.

Discography

Singles

Albums

References 

Japanese women pop singers
1981 births
Living people
Musicians from Okinawa Prefecture
20th-century Japanese women singers
20th-century Japanese singers
21st-century Japanese women singers
21st-century Japanese singers